Kelly Katlyn Barnhill (born March 31, 1997) is an American, former collegiate All-American, professional softball pitcher. She played college softball for the Florida Gators from 2016 to 2019 and was named the USA Softball Collegiate Player of the Year, Honda Sports Award and espnW Player of the Year in 2017. She is the career no hitters (7), strikeouts, strikeout ratio (10.5) and WHIP leader for the Gators. She also ranks in career strikeout ratio for both the Southeastern Conference and the NCAA Division I. 

Barnhill was selected first overall by the Chicago Bandits in the 2019 NPF Draft. In 2020, she participated in the inaugural Athletes Unlimited Softball league. Barnhill has also played softball for Team USA and Team Mexico, who both qualified for the postponed 2020 Summer Olympics.

Early life and high school
Born and raised in Marietta, Georgia, Barnhill tried out many sports in her youth, beginning with soccer. She would eventually drop soccer in favor of softball, citing that there was "way too much running" in soccer. She played travel ball with the EC Bullets Gold Barnhill attended Pope High School in Marietta, where she recorded 22 no-hitters and was a three time Pope High School MVP. She led Pope to the 2014 class 6A state championship. Barnhill considered attending Stanford University, but committed to the University of Florida in October 2014, during her senior year of high school.

Barnhill's high school softball play was recognized—in 2015, she was named the Georgia Gatorade Player of the Year and the USA Today Softball Player of the Year. She was also named NFCA and Louisville Slugger High School All-American. In 2013 and 2014, she was a candidate for the Georgia Gatorade Player of the Year before being named in 2015.

College career
2016
Barnhill played her freshman season for the Florida Gators in 2016. During the year, she was twice named the SEC Freshman of the Week. She was named to the 2016 SEC First Year Academic Honor Roll, as well as the 2016 SEC All-Freshman Team. She finished her freshman season with a 15-1 record, as well as 167 strikeouts and an opponents' batting average of .140 in 108.1 innings pitched.

2017
In 2017, Barnhill led the NCAA in earned run average (ERA) and strikeouts per seven innings (0.51 and 13.0, respectively). Those statistics were records among University of Florida pitchers; Barnhill set additional school records in lowest opponent batting average (.121), most combined shutouts (10), most strikeouts looking (100) and lowest stolen base percentage (.333). She was named an All-SEC First Team player. Heading into the SEC Tournament, the Gators were ranked No. 1 in the nation, and Barnhill was named the SEC Pitcher of the Year.

Her ERA during the season was noted by sports outlets, espnW commented in April that "the company she keeps in ERA at the moment is the context by which it is clear that she is the nation's best pitcher." espnW later named her their Softball Player of the Year, describing her as "NCAA softball's most statistically dominant pitching presence in a decade." She won the Honda Sports Award as the nation's top softball player. She was also named the USA Softball Collegiate Player of the Year in 2017. On July 12, 2017, she was awarded the ESPY Award for Best Female College Athlete, for the 2017 season. She was the first player in Florida's softball program history to win an ESPY award.

2018
Barnhill was an academic honoree in 2018. She was also named the NCAA Division I Academic All-American of the Year in softball. Barnhill also earned her second All-SEC First Team and SEC Pitcher of the Year selections. The Gators enjoyed team success as well, as they won the 2018 SEC softball tournament.

2019
Entering her senior year, Barnhill became a founding member of UF's Alpha Phi chapter. Barnhill played her fourth and final season of collegiate softball in 2019. She was named to the All-SEC Second Team, as well as her third consecutive SEC Academic Honor Roll. The Gators defeated the Alabama Crimson Tide to win their second consecutive SEC tournament championship. Barnhill was named the MVP of the tournament. At the end of her Gators softball career, she held school records in ERA (0.92), opponent batting average (.124), and strikeouts (1,208). She finished her Gators career as the Florida program's career strikeouts leader.

Professional career
On April 16, 2019, the Chicago Bandits of the National Pro Fastpitch league selected Barnhill first overall in the 2019 NPF Draft. Her teammate at Florida, Amanda Lorenz, was selected directly after her by the USSSA Pride. The Bandits finished with the best regular season record in the 2019 NPF season, but went on to be swept by the Pride in the best–of–five championship series. Barnhill signed a one-year extension with the Bandits on February 10, 2020.

National team career
Barnhill has represented Team USA since 2015, when she was a member of the USA Junior Women's national softball team. That year she was a gold medalist at the 2015 World Baseball Softball Confederation (WBSC) Junior Women's Softball World Championship. During that competition, Barnhill led the U.S. pitching staff with a 6-0 record, 51 strikeouts and a 0.54 ERA in 26 innings pitched.

Barnhill then represented the USA Women's national softball team at the 2016 World Cup of Softball, and earned a silver medal. At the 2016 WBSC Women's Softball World Championship, Barnhill was a gold medalist, pitching four innings with four strikeouts and two hits allowed.

Barnhill again represented the women's national softball team during their second consecutive gold medal run in 2018. During the competition, she pitched seven innings with eight strikeouts and a 0.00 ERA.

Career statistics

References

External links
 

1997 births
Chicago Bandits players
Florida Gators softball players
Living people
Softball players from Georgia (U.S. state)
Sportspeople from Marietta, Georgia